The Umeå Pentecostal Church is a church building in Umeå, Sweden, belonging to the Swedish Pentecostal Movement. Located in the eastern parts of town, it was earlier known as the Philadelphia Church. It hosted hosting the broadcastings of Swedish TV programme Hela kyrkan sjunger.

References 

20th-century Pentecostal church buildings
Buildings and structures in Umeå
20th-century churches in Sweden
Pentecostal churches in Sweden